Allium ebusitanum is a plant species known from the Spanish Island of Ibiza in the Balearic Islands, as well as from Tunisia and Algeria.

References

ebusitanum
Onions
Flora of Spain
Flora of the Balearic Islands
Flora of Tunisia
Flora of Algeria
Plants described in 1924